Pippi Longstocking (original German title: Pippi Langstrumpf) is a 1969 Swedish/West German movie, based on the eponymous children's books by Astrid Lindgren with the cast of the 1969 TV series Pippi Longstocking. The film consisted of re-edited footage from the TV series featuring a new soundtrack. It was produced by Beta Film, one of the German co-producers of the original show, while the Swedish TV series was still in post-production and has never been presented in Sweden. The movie was followed by Pippi Goes on Board, released later in the same year. It was released in the US in 1973.

Plot
A mysterious young girl, Pippi Longstocking, moves into the abandoned Villa Villekulla. The redheaded Pippi, living alone but for a monkey called Mr. Nilsson and her horse Little Old Man, befriends two neighboring children, Tommy and Annika. Soon inseparable companions, the three youngsters embark upon a series of colorful escapades, which turn the small Swedish town upside down. Local busybody Miss Prysselius schemes to have Pippi put into a children's home, and sets the town's bumbling cops Kling and Klang on her with riotous results.

Cast
Inger Nilsson - Pippi Longstocking
Maria Persson - Annika
Pär Sundberg - Tommy
Beppe Wolgers - Captain Efraim Longstocking
Margot Trooger - Mrs. Prysselius
Hans Clarin - Dunder-Karlsson
Paul Esser - Blom
Ulf G. Johnsson - Police Inspector Kling
Göthe Grefbo - Police Inspector Klang
Fredrik Ohlsson - Mr. Settergren
Öllegård Wellton - Mrs. Settergren
Staffan Hallerstam - Benke

In popular culture 
The film is shown in the episode "We Got Us a Pippi Virgin" of season 5 of Gilmore Girls. In the episode, Rory Gilmore and Lorelai Gilmore profess their love for the film and choose to watch it in place of Cool Hand Luke.

See also
Pippi Longstocking - character
Pippi Longstocking - Swedish television series

References

External links
 

1969 films
1960s adventure comedy films
Swedish adventure comedy films
West German films
Films directed by Olle Hellbom
Films set in Sweden
Films based on Pippi Longstocking
Films based on television series
Compilation films
Films edited from television programs
1969 comedy films
1960s Swedish films

no:Pippi Langstrømpe I (1969)